Eddie O'Toole (28 June 1921 – 12 September 1997) was an American long-distance runner who competed in the 1948 Summer Olympics.

References

1921 births
1997 deaths
American male long-distance runners
Olympic track and field athletes of the United States
Athletes (track and field) at the 1948 Summer Olympics
20th-century American people